Frank Herbert Mason (February 20, 1921 – June 16, 2009) was an American painter and teacher.

Early life
Frank Herbert Mason was born on February 20, 1921, in Cleveland, Ohio. His father was a Shakespearean actor and his mother was a violinist and a pianist. He attended the Music and Arts High School in New York City until he was awarded a scholarship to study at the Art Students League of New York with Frank DuMond.

Career
In 1951, he began teaching at the Art Students League.

His painting, the Resurrection of Christ, can be seen in Old St. Patrick's Cathedral in New York City. In 1962, he received a commission to paint eight large paintings of the Life of St. Anthony of Padua, which were permanently installed in the 11th-century Church of San Giovanni de Malta, in Venice, where his paintings hang alongside a painting by Giovanni Bellini. Consequently, the Order of Malta conferred upon him the Cross of Merit, Prima Classe. He became the first painter to receive the honor since Caravaggio.

In response to the overcleaning of the Sistine Chapel, Mason, along with James Beck, professor of art history at Columbia University, helped form the organization, ArtWatch International.

Mason served as president of the National Society of Mural Painters for the 1995–96 year.

Personal life
He married Phyllis Harriman, the daughter of banker E. Roland Harriman and philanthropist Gladys Fries Harriman. Together, they had:
Arden Harriman Mason, and artist and musician
Mason died in 2009.

Legacy
A full-length documentary film produced by Maestro Films premiered at the Big Apple Film Festival in New York City on November 3, 2011.

References

External links
Official Website

1921 births
2009 deaths
Artists from Cleveland
Painters from New York City
Art Students League of New York alumni
Art Students League of New York faculty
20th-century American painters
American male painters
21st-century American painters
21st-century American male artists
The High School of Music & Art alumni
20th-century American male artists